Souad Yaacoubi was Tunisia's Minister of Public Health in 1983. She was the first woman to hold this post.

References

Year of birth missing (living people)
Living people
Women government ministers of Tunisia
Government ministers of Tunisia
20th-century Tunisian women politicians
20th-century Tunisian politicians
Place of birth missing (living people)